William Frank Boyland Jr. is an American convicted felon and former politician from the state of New York. A Democrat, Boyland represented District 55 (Brooklyn) in the New York State Assembly and was first elected in a 2003 special election. He forfeited his Assembly seat on March 6, 2014 due to his conviction on federal felony charges related to extortion, bribery, and official corruption, and he was sentenced to 14 years in prison.

Life and career
Prior to his election to the Assembly, Boyland served as an intern in the offices of several United States Congressmen, including those of fellow Brooklynites Edolphus Towns and Major Owens.

Boyland comes from a family of Brooklyn politicians. His sister, Tracy L. Boyland, was the Chairwoman of the Women's Issues Committee on the New York City Council. His uncle, Thomas S. Boyland, was a member of the Assembly from 1977 to 1982, and his father, William F. Boyland Sr., occupied a seat in the New York State Assembly for two decades. Boyland's father stepped down from the Assembly in the middle of a term, and Boyland sought election to the seat his father vacated. Boyland was first elected to the Assembly in a 2003 special election. He represented Assembly District 55 in Brooklyn.

Prosecution, conviction, and imprisonment
On March 10, 2011, Boyland was among eight individuals (including State Senator Carl Kruger) who surrendered to face charges in a federal corruption case accusing the lawmakers of taking bribes over the course of a decade. On November 10, 2011, Boyland was acquitted of those charges. Before the end of the month, he was arrested again on separate federal bribery charges, with prosecutors claiming to have secretly recorded him soliciting $250,000 in bribes even while the first set of charges was still unresolved. Boyland's chief of staff, Ry-Ann Hermon, was also arrested on related charges, and eventually pleaded guilty. On March 8, 2013, Boyland was charged with three additional counts of mail fraud for falsely securing tens of thousands of dollars in travel reimbursements. Several weeks later, another fraud charge was added for steering taxpayer money to a nonprofit agency and directing that agency to reimburse him for other expenses. On May 14, 2013, Boyland pleaded not guilty.

On March 6, 2014, Boyland was convicted of all 21 felony counts he faced, including extortion, bribery, and mail fraud (Eastern District of New York, docket no. 11-CR-850). Upon conviction, Boyland immediately lost his seat in the Assembly. In September 2015, he was sentenced to 14 years in federal prison; the sentence "fell short of the minimum of 19 years sought by prosecutors but exceeded many of the prison terms imposed on other state lawmakers in a string of Albany corruption cases.". As of August 2016, he was serving his sentence at the Federal Correctional Institution, Loretto, a low-security federal prison in Western Pennsylvania.

References

External links
2 State Legislators Surrender in Corruption Case
New York State Assembly Member Website
Gotham Gazette's Eye On Albany: New York State Assembly: District 55
Project Vote Smart: Interest Group Ratings
Two City Assembly Seats Open Up, but Successors Seem All Set
Biography: New York State Democratic Committee

Living people
Baptists from New York (state)
Democratic Party members of the New York State Assembly
Mail and wire fraud
Politicians convicted of mail and wire fraud
American politicians convicted of bribery
New York (state) politicians convicted of corruption
New York (state) politicians convicted of crimes
African-American state legislators in New York (state)
21st-century American politicians
1970 births
20th-century African-American people